The 1998 Lunar New Year Cup ( Carlsberg Cup) was a football tournament held in Hong Kong over the first and fourth day of the Chinese New Year holiday (28 January and 31 January 1998).

Participating teams
 
  Hong Kong League XI (host)

Results
All times given in Hong Kong Time (UTC+8).

Semifinals

Third place match

Final

Bracket

Top scorers
3 goals
  Paul Foster
1 goal
  Manuel Neira
  Rodrigo Barrera
  Mehdi Mahdavikia
  Samson Siasia
  Patrick Pascal
  Ahmed Garba

See also
Hong Kong Football Association
Hong Kong First Division League

External links
 HKFA Website 漫談賀歲足球賽事(九) (in chinese)

References

1998
1997–98 in Hong Kong football
1997–98 in Nigerian football
1997–98 in Iranian football
1998 in Chilean football